is a Japanese former Nippon Professional Baseball player.

External links

1954 births
Living people
People from Odawara
Baseball people from Kanagawa Prefecture
Japanese baseball players
Nippon Professional Baseball infielders
Taiyō Whales players
Yokohama Taiyō Whales players
Japanese baseball coaches
Nippon Professional Baseball coaches